Penicillium christenseniae is a fungus species of the genus of Penicillium which was isolated from native forest near Costa Rica. Penicillium christenseniae is named after Martha Christensen.

See also
List of Penicillium species

References

christenseniae
Fungi described in 2011